John Hanna (November 3, 1863 in Philadelphia, Pennsylvania – November 7, 1930 in Philadelphia, Pennsylvania) was a 19th-century professional baseball catcher.

External links

1863 births
1930 deaths
Richmond Virginians players
Washington Nationals (AA) players
Major League Baseball catchers
Baseball players from Pennsylvania
19th-century baseball players
Baltimore Monumentals (minor league) players
Newburyport Clamdiggers players
Toledo Avengers players